This is a list of buildings, sites, districts, and objects listed on the National Register of Historic Places in Alabama.

Numbers of properties and districts
There are approximately 1,200 properties and districts listed on the National Register of Historic Places in Alabama. The numbers of properties and districts in Alabama or in any of its 67 counties are not directly reported by the National Register. Following are tallies of current listings from lists of the specific properties and districts.

See also

List of National Historic Landmarks in Alabama
List of Alabama state parks
List of bridges on the National Register of Historic Places in Alabama

Notes

References

 Listings
Alabama